Stefanía Teresa Maggiolini Fort (born 15 October 1986) is a Uruguayan football manager and former player, who played as a defensive midfielder. She has been a member of the Uruguay women's national team. She currently manages the women's under-19 team of Defensor Sporting.

Maggiolini previously played for Club Nacional, Rampla Juniors and CA River Plate in Montevideo and UE L'Estartit in Spain.

As a member of the Uruguay national team, she played 20 games in U19, U20, First team and 2007 Pan American Games.

Club career
Born in Montevideo, Uruguay, Maggiolini started her career with Club Nacional de Football. In 2003, she was the top scorer making 17 goals in the first division with only 14 years.

International career
Maggiolini represented Uruguay at the 2004 South American U-19 Women's Championship and the 2006 South American U-20 Women's Championship. At senior level, she played two Copa América Femenina editions (2003, 2006 and 2010) and the 2007 Pan American Games.

References

1986 births
Living people
Women's association football midfielders
Uruguayan women's footballers
Footballers from Montevideo
Uruguay women's international footballers
Pan American Games competitors for Uruguay
Footballers at the 2007 Pan American Games
UE L'Estartit players
Uruguayan expatriate women's footballers
Uruguayan expatriate sportspeople in Spain
Expatriate women's footballers in Spain
Women's association football managers
Uruguayan football managers
Female association football managers